Mount Lloyd George is a  peak in British Columbia, Canada, rising to a prominence of   above Lloyd George Pass. The mountain is located NE of Haworth Lake in Kwadacha Wilderness Provincial Park. It is part of the Northern Rocky Mountains.

Geology
Lying in the Muskwa Ranges, Mount Lloyd George is a castellated limestone and quartzite peak. 
The diamictite sedimentary deposits of the mountain, several kilometers thick, date to the late Precambrian and probably have a glacial-marine origin.
The age of the diamictite is not certain.  It may be associated with either the Toby or the Vreeland formations of the North American Cordillera.

Ice field
There is a major concentration of glaciers around the mountain.
The small Llanberis Glacier flows west from the icefield to Hawarth Lake. The larger Kwadacha and Lloyd George glaciers drain the icefield to the east.

Name
The mountain was named by Paul Leland Haworth after David Lloyd George, the British Prime Minister towards the end of World War I.  In the words of Raymond M. Patterson,

References

Sources

External links 
 

Two-thousanders of British Columbia
Canadian Rockies
Peace River Land District